Royith Bhoola was a member of the National Assembly of South Africa. Until the party lost all of its seats in the 2014 election, he was the only representative of the Minority Front.

Allegations of corruption

In 2004 it was announced that he had negotiated a deal to sell his parliamentary seat to long-time friend Mohamed Sadek Mansoo.

References

Members of the National Assembly of South Africa
Living people
Minority Front politicians
Year of birth missing (living people)
Place of birth missing (living people)
21st-century South African politicians